Camptochaete is a genus of mosses found in Australasia. The genus was described in 1870 by Heinrich Wilhelm Reichardt (1835–1885). The name, from Greek kamptos, meaning bent, altered, and chaite, meaning hair, bristle, likely refers to the curved seta.

Species include:

 Camptochaete aciphylla Dixon & Sainsbury
 Camptochaete angustata (Mitt.) Reichardt
 Camptochaete arbuscula (Sm.) Reichardt
 Camptochaete curvata Tangney
 Camptochaete deflexa (Wilson) A.Jaeger
 Camptochaete excavata (Taylor) A.Jaeger
 Camptochaete leichhardtii (Hampe) Broth.
 Camptochaete monolina Meagher & Cairns
 Camptochaete pulvinata (Hook.f. & Wilson) A.Jaeger
 Camptochaete subporotrichoides (Broth. & Geh.) Broth. (Besch.)

References

Lembophyllaceae
Plants described in 1870
Moss genera